Below is the list of confirmed broadcasting rights holders for UEFA Euro 2004.

Broadcasters

UEFA

Rest of the world

References

UEFA Euro 2004
2004